Elizabeth Flint Wade (1849–1915) was an early 20th-century American author, poet and pictorial photographer. She is best known for the photographs she exhibited with Rose Clark under their joint names, either as "Rose Clark and Elizabeth Flint Wade" or as "Misses Clark and Wade".

Life
Wade was born in Cassville, New York, on 29 October 1849. Her parents were George Barnett Flint and Elizabeth Tracy Avery.

She married Frank Abernathy Wade (1836 or 1837-1906) on 24 November 1869 in Buffalo. They had one daughter, Blanche Elizabeth (1872-?), and two sons, Frank (1874-?) and Herman (1877-?).

Wade’s interest in photography developed sometime before 1890. In 1893 she wrote an article called "Artistic Pictures, Suggestions on How to Make Them" in American Amateur Photographer. In the late 1890s she was put in charge of Harpers magazine Round Table Camera Club, and in 1900 Harpers Bazaar began publishing a series of her articles on photography.

In 1906 Wade was listed in an article in Photo-Era as "among those in the professional ranks achieving success". Other women mentioned were Gertrude Käsebier, Eva Watson-Schütze and Jessie Tarbox Beals.

Wade was a respected writer and poet, and her stories and poems appeared in Atlantic Monthly, Collier's Weekly, Black Cat, Herald, New York World and Everybody's.
She also frequently wrote about photography in magazine such as the American Amateur Photographer, Photo-Era, Photographic Times, Photo-American and Harpers Magazine. From 1910 to 1912 she was associate editor of Photo-Era, and she critiqued many prints submitted by readers.

Wade died in her home Norwalk, Connecticut on 1 December 1915.

References
    

1849 births
1915 deaths
19th-century American photographers
20th-century American photographers
20th-century American women photographers
19th-century American women photographers